The 2010 Supercopa de España was a two-legged Spanish football match-up played on 14 August and 21 August 2010. It was contested by Sevilla, the 2009–10 Copa del Rey winners, and Barcelona, the 2009–10 La Liga winners.

Barcelona won 5–3 on aggregate for their ninth Supercopa de España title.

Match details

First leg

Second leg

References

2
FC Barcelona matches
Sevilla FC matches
2010